Ghazala Lari is an Indian politician belonging to Samajwadi Party. She was an MLA from Rampur Karkhana Assembly Constituency of Deoria. Ghazala Lari married Chowdhuri Mohammad Basheer after the death of her first husband Murad Lari, who was Bahujan Samaj Party MLA from Salempur. She contested the election from the same seat in 2002 and won by 4,000 votes.

References

Samajwadi Party politicians
People from Kanpur
Living people
Women in Uttar Pradesh politics
Indian people of Iraqi descent
21st-century Indian women politicians
21st-century Indian politicians
Year of birth missing (living people)
People from Deoria district